Zlatković is a surname found in Serbia and Croatia, derived from a masculine given name Zlatko. Notable people with the surname include:

Danijel Zlatković (born 1996), Serbian footballer
Miloš Zlatković (born 1997), Serbian footballer
Nemanja Zlatković (born 1988), Serbian footballer
Siniša Zlatković, Yugoslav footballer

Serbian surnames
Croatian surnames